Agasanamatti  is a village in the southern state of Karnataka, India. It is located in the Haveri taluk of Haveri district in Karnataka.

See also
 Haveri
 Districts of Karnataka

References

External links
 http://Haveri.nic.in/

Villages in Haveri district